The 1987–88 Australian region cyclone season was the one of least active Australian region tropical cyclone seasons on record. It officially started on 1 November 1987, and officially ended on 30 April 1988. The regional tropical cyclone operational plan defines a "tropical cyclone year" separately from a "tropical cyclone season"; the "tropical cyclone year" began on 1 July 1987 and ended on 30 June 1988.

Seasonal summary

Systems

Tropical Low Ariny

Tropical Cyclone Agi 

Cyclone Agi veered away from the main islands of Papua New Guinea's Milne Bay province yesterday after flattening many buildings, uprooting trees and disrupting water supplies. Agi brought heavy rain, high tides and winds gusting at more than 100 km/h to the remote islands it brushed at the eastern tip of the PNG mainland since it formed and began to swirl through the area on Sunday.

Severe Tropical Cyclone Frederic 

Frederic, 28 January to 2 February 1988, Indian Ocean

Severe Tropical Cyclone Gwenda-Ezenina 

Gwenda-Ezenina, 6 to 12 February 1988, Indian Ocean

Severe Tropical Cyclone Charlie 

Early on 21 February, a tropical low formed over the Coral Sea. The system was upgraded to a tropical cyclone at 18:00 UTC on 22 February, given the name Charlie. Charlie continued to strengthen for around a day while turning towards the south, however began to weaken soon after. Following a period of slight weakening, Charlie maintained its intensity and slowly moved towards the west. Early on 27 February, Charlie began to intensify once again, continuing its westerly movement until 36 hours later, when it turned towards the south. Charlie made its first landfall near Cape Bowling Green and reached its peak intensity as a Category 3 severe tropical cyclone during 29 February and later made its second landfall, in Upstart Bay. The cyclone weakened rapidly over land and dissipated on 1 March.

As Charlie made landfall in a sparsely populated area, structural damage was minimal, however significant crop damage occurred, amounting to $15 million (1990 AUD).

Tropical Cyclone Herbie 

Herbie, 17 to 20 May 1988, Indian Ocean

See also 
 Atlantic hurricane seasons: 1987, 1988
 Eastern Pacific hurricane seasons: 1987, 1988
 Western Pacific typhoon seasons: 1987, 1988
 North Indian Ocean cyclone seasons: 1987, 1988

References 

 
Australian region cyclone seasons
Articles which contain graphical timelines
Tropical cyclones in 1987
Tropical cyclones in 1988